SailMail is radio based e-mail system designed for boat owners operating beyond line-of-sight radio links to the internet.  Much of its underlying technology is built upon the Winlink software originally developed by amateur radio enthusiasts. 
Operation on SailMail network frequencies requires a PACTOR modem and an SSB radio. Sailmail operators do not need to hold an amateur radio license, as is the case for the similar Airmail product.

References

External links
 Official SailMail Site

Yachting